Maldivian may refer to:
 Maldivian people (ethnic group), the ethnic group inhabiting the historic region of the Maldive Islands comprising what is now officially the Republic of Maldives and the island of Minicoy in Union territory of Lakshadweep, India
 Maldivian language ("Dhivehi language"), the language spoken in the historic region of the Maldive Islands comprising what is now officially the Republic of Maldives and the island of Minicoy in Union territory of Lakshadweep, India
 Maldivian cuisine
Maldivian (airline), the airline division of Island Aviation Services based in Malé, in the Maldives
 Something of, from, or related to the Republic of Maldives

See also 
 

Language and nationality disambiguation pages